The 1953 Kentucky Derby was the 79th running of the Kentucky Derby. The race took place on May 2, 1953.

Full results

References

1953
Kentucky Derby
Derby
Kentucky
Kentucky Derby